Chirbury with Brompton is a civil parish in Shropshire, England.  It contains 80 listed buildings that are recorded in the National Heritage List for England.  Of these, two are listed at Grade I, the highest of the three grades, four are at Grade II*, the middle grade, and the others are at Grade II, the lowest grade.  The parish contains villages and smaller settlements, including Chirbury, Brompton, Middleton, Marton, Pentreheyling, Priestweston, Rorrington, Stockton, and Wotherton, and is otherwise completely rural.  Most of the listed buildings are houses, cottages, farmhouses, farm buildings and associated structures, mainly of which are timber framed, or which have a timber-framed core, and which date from the 15th to the late 17th century.  The other listed buildings include churches and items in the churchyards, a public house, a former mill, a bridge, three milestones, a pump, and two war memorials.


Key

Buildings

References

Citations

Sources

Lists of buildings and structures in Shropshire